Bottled Demon is a 1990 role-playing game adventure for Shadowrun published by FASA.

Plot summary
Bottled Demon is an adventure in which the player characters are hired in a bar.

Publication history
Bottled Demon was written by James D. Long, with a cover by John Zeleznik, and was published by FASA Corp. in 1990 as a 64-page book.

Reception
Games International magazine reviewed Bottled Demon and stated that "Bottled Demon is an object-oriented adventure for Shadowrunners that will get paranoid players asking the age-old question: why us?"

References

Role-playing game supplements introduced in 1990
Shadowrun adventures